The Convict (French: Le bagnard) is a 1951 French drama film directed by Willy Rozier and starring Lucien Nat, Lili Bontemps and Juliette Faber. It was shot at the Victorine Studios in Nice and on location around Marseille and in French Guiana.

Synopsis
A doctor from Marseille is convicted of murder and sent to a penal colony in South America. He escapes and fins refuge with a local community.

Cast
 Pierre Gay as 	Le docteur Julien
 Lucien Nat as Messner
 Lili Bontemps as 	Marie-Lou
 Henri Arius as 	Le voisin 
 Roger Blin as 	Un bagnard
 Juliette Faber as 	Pilar
 Lucien Callamand as 	Maître Gloriette
 Daniel Mendaille as 	Le chef de la plantation
 Henry Houry as 	L'avocat de la défense
 Milly Mathis as 	Mme Rosano
 Georges Sellier as 	Le professeur Elie Dubois - un médecin
 Anna Berrecci as 	Anna
 André Wasley as	Un bagnard
 Colette Deréal as 	Emma
 Jenny Hélia as 	La femme hilare	
 Marco Villa as 	Ratichon
 Marthe Marty as La mère d'Emma
 Max Amyl as 	L'accordéoniste

References

Bibliography
 Rège, Philippe. Encyclopedia of French Film Directors, Volume 1. Scarecrow Press, 2009.

External links 
 

1951 films
1951 drama films
French drama films
1950s French-language films
Films directed by Willy Rozier
Films set in Marseille
Films shot in Marseille
Films shot at Victorine Studios
Films shot in French Guiana
Films set in South America
1950s French films